Ertuğrul Apakan (born 1947) is a Turkish diplomat. Ambassador Apakan was the Chief Monitor of the OSCE Special Monitoring Mission to Ukraine between 2 April 2014 and 30 May 2019.

Ambassador Apakan has had a longstanding diplomatic career, most recently as the Permanent Representative of Turkey to the United Nations (2009 – 2012) and as Undersecretary at the Turkish Ministry of Foreign Affairs (2006 – 2009).

Early history and professional life
Apakan was born in Bornova, Izmir, Turkey. He graduated from Bornova Anatolian High School and Ankara University, Faculty of Political Science (1969) and completed his master's degree in economics at the Ege University in Izmir.

Apakan joined the Turkish Foreign Ministry in 1971. After many diplomatic duties, he was the ambassador to Northern Cyprus from 1996 to 2000. Apakan served as Deputy Under-Secretary for Bilateral Political Affairs from 2004 to 2006 and as the Under-Secretary of the Ministry of Foreign Affairs of Turkey from December 2006 until August 2009. He became the Permanent Representative of Turkey to the United Nations in New York in August 2009. During September 2010, Apakan was the President of the United Nations Security Council. He also chaired United Nations Security Council Counter-Terrorism Committee in 2010.

On 2 April 2014 he was appointed Chief Monitor of the OSCE Special Monitoring Mission to Ukraine  by OSCE Chairperson-in-Office. He was replaced in this position by Yaşar Halit Çevik in 2019.

References
"Official Website of the Permanent Mission of Turkey to the UN"
"United Nations Security Council Counter-Terrorism Committee"
"His Excellency Ertugrul Apakan", The Washington Diplomat, 2011-04-03

1947 births
Living people
Ambassadors of Turkey to Northern Cyprus
Permanent Representatives of Turkey to the United Nations
20th-century Turkish diplomats
Ankara University Faculty of Political Sciences alumni
Ege University alumni
People from Bornova